Every Extend Extra Extreme is a game for the Xbox 360's Xbox Live Arcade service released on October 17, 2007. It is an expanded version of the PlayStation Portable game Every Extend Extra which is, in itself, an expanded version of the 2004 freeware title Every Extend.

The game runs in high-definition 1080i and supports 5.1 surround sound. It supports online multiplayer; Achievements; Leaderboards and GamerScore support; and online competitive modes.

Gameplay
In Every Extend Extra Extreme, the player controls a ship which can detonate at any time. This causes any enemies within a certain radius to explode, which in turn cause other enemies to explode in a chain reaction. As the game continues more and more enemies populate the screen allowing longer and higher scoring explosions. The player may halt the chain at any time to pick up power-ups (such as to increase enemy speed, add time, add temporary shield) or to start a new chain reaction.

The explosions add a percussive beat to the background music. The player's ship is destroyed when coming into contact with or being shot by an enemy while the player's shields are down. This resets the level to its initial slow pace and bonus multiplier, therefore hindering the player's scoring.

The game contains four modes of gameplay: E4: The Game Time Unlimited, E4: The Game Time Limited, S4: Wiz ur Musik (taps into the music on the Xbox 360 hard drive and creates randomly generated wire-frame visuals to move across the screen using bass and treble as their director), R4: The Revenge (a shooter mode where the players have to avoid certain enemies)

Reception

Every Extend Extra Extreme was met with "generally favorable" reviews from critics, with an aggregate score of 78/100 on Metacritic.

IGN gave the game an 8.5 out of 10, describing the game as "unique" and "trippy". GameSpot complimented the visuals, stating "It's as much an interactive lightshow as it is a game, and the flashing, spacey visuals in combination with the pulsing, electronic soundtrack make it a hypnotic and singular experience." Eurogamer was more negative towards the game, criticizing how easy it was to get on the top leaderboard and unable to do anything during chains.

Notes

References

External links
 

2007 video games
Q Entertainment games
Xbox 360 Live Arcade games
Xbox 360-only games
Xbox 360 games